Conceiving Ada is a 1997 film produced, written, and directed by Lynn Hershman Leeson. Henry S. Rosenthal was co-producer of the film. The cinematography was by Hiro Narita and Bill Zarchy.

Synopsis
Emmy Coer is a computer scientist obsessed with Countess Ada Lovelace, author of the first computer algorithm, written for Charles Babbage's "Analytical Engine".  She is upset to discover that she is pregnant, believing that the pregnancy will interfere with her work. Afraid of losing her boyfriend, she decides to keep the baby. Emmy tries to work on a way of communicating with Lovelace in the past by way of "undying information waves". She eventually succeeds and is able to communicate with Ada and learn about her studies, her work and how she felt that in many ways her work was hampered by her children and by the time she lived in. Emmy wants to bring Ada into the present by allowing her to inhabit her body. A dying Ada refuses, insisting that Emmy needs to live her own life. However, by 2002 Emmy is raising a daughter who has been embedded with Ada's consciousness and who already shows a precociousness with computers despite the fact that Emmy is trying to raise her to have a normal childhood.

Cast
 Tilda Swinton as Ada Augusta Byron King, Countess of Lovelace
 Francesca Faridany as Emmy Coer 
 Timothy Leary as Sims
 Karen Black as Lady Byron/Mother Coer 
 John O'Keefe as  Charles Babbage 
 John Perry Barlow as John Crosse
 J.D. Wolfe as Nicholas Clayton
 Owen Murphy as William Lovelace 
 David Brooks as Children's Tutor (David)

Reception
Upon its February 1999 premiere in New York City, Stephen Holden called its premise "intriguing" though the film is "much better at throwing out ideas than at telling a story or at creating compelling characters"; it has a "overall air of woodenness and shrill didacticism".

That same month, Edward Guthmann of the San Francisco Chronicle called it a "film without category or precedent. A meditation on memory, feminism, immortality and the horizons of virtual reality, it's got enough ideas and intellectual fodder for a dozen films — which is its virtue and its defect at the same time. Directed by local video artist Lynn Hershman Leeson, Conceiving Ada is a fanciful, multilayered experiment about two women who connect through cyberspace across the divide of time and discover some remarkable parallels between their lives."

On Rotten Tomatoes it has an approval rating of 82% based on reviews from 11 critics.

References

External links
 

1997 films
1990s science fiction films
1990s feminist films
Films about mathematics
American feminist films
American science fiction films
German science fiction films
1990s biographical films
1990s English-language films
1990s American films
1990s German films